The Ralph E. Chambers Engineering Company was mainly an amusement ride manufacturing firm that took over the facilities of the bankrupt Traver Engineering Company in Beaver Falls, Pennsylvania from 1933 into 1962, although Harry Traver continued to work for the company.

Ralph E. Chambers was the Traver Engineering Company's chief engineer, and Chambers Engineering designed and built many of the rides for the New York World's Fair of 1939 and 1940, with Harry Traver continuing to design and engineer the Chambers products, including the Speed King Auto Racer.

Chambers Engineering came to an end when the company experienced a devastating plant fire in 1968. Some of their more famous rides include The Whip, The Caterpillar, The Laff In The Dark, and Tumble Bug.

References

Further reading

 (June 14, 2001.) "A thrill a minute: Golden age of amusement park lives on." Farm and Dairy.

Amusement park companies